Inge Johan Lønning (20 February 1938 – 24 March 2013) was a Norwegian Lutheran theologian and politician for the Conservative Party of Norway. As an academic, he was Professor of Theology and Rector of the University of Oslo during the term 1985–1992. As a politician, he served as President of the European Movement in Norway, as a Member of Parliament, as Vice President of the Parliament, as Vice President of the Conservative Party, and as President of the Nordic Council.

Biography
Lønning was born in Fana, Bergen, Norway.
He was the son of Per Lønning (1898–1974) and Anna Gurine Strømø (1895–1966).
His older brother was Bishop Per Lønning  (1928-2016).
He earned his cand. theol. degree from the University of Oslo in 1962 and finished the practical-theological seminar in 1963. He continued his academic career with a fellowship from 1963 to 1971, with a year's interruption for military service as a chaplain in the Norwegian Navy. He earned his doctorate in theology at the University of Oslo in 1971 and was appointed professor in systematic theology at the University of Oslo the same year.
In 1985 he was elected rector of the University of Oslo, serving until 1992, while maintaining his chair as professor of theology until his retirement in 2008.

In 1971, Lønning also started his political career, when he was elected into the Oslo city council for one term and also the city's board of education for eight years.
Lønning was elected as a member of Norwegian parliament for three terms, from 1997 through 2009. He was (at the time of his death) the president of Lagtinget, was vice president of Stortinget from 2001 to 2005, and also served as a member of several parliamentary committees.

He was president of the Nordic Council in 2003, and was awarded honorary doctorates from Luther College and Åbo Akademi University. He was a member of the Norwegian Academy of Science and Letters.

He died on 24 March 2013, after he fell ill while cross country skiing at Beitostølen.

Selected works
 Frihet til tro. En bok om Bibel og bekjennelse (Oslo: Gyldendal. 1980)   
Fellesskap og frihet. Tid for idépolitikk (Oslo: Genesis.1997)

References

External links
 
Nordic Council website  

1938 births
2013 deaths
University of Oslo alumni
Academic staff of the University of Oslo
Rectors of the University of Oslo
Norwegian theologians
Members of the Norwegian Academy of Science and Letters
Norwegian military chaplains
Conservative Party (Norway) politicians
Members of the Storting
Politicians from Oslo
Royal Norwegian Navy chaplains
20th-century Protestant theologians
Vice Presidents of the Storting
Grand Crosses 1st class of the Order of Merit of the Federal Republic of Germany
21st-century Norwegian politicians
20th-century Norwegian politicians
20th-century Lutherans